The  or Nagoya Line is a railway line operated by the private railway operator Nagoya Railroad (Meitetsu), connecting Toyohashi Station in Toyohashi with Meitetsu Gifu Station in Gifu.

Since its amalgamation in 1944 (see History section) this has been the Meitetsu main line. Many branch lines of Meitetsu have through services to/from the Nagoya Line. All the stations accept manaca, a smart card.

The line largely parallels the Tōkaidō Main Line in the Chūkyō Metropolitan Area (Greater Nagoya). Local traffic on the Nagoya Line used to be much heavier than on the Tōkaidō Main Line, but since the privatization of the Japanese National Railways (JNR), transforming into the Central Japan Railway Company (JR Central) in this area, competition has become more significant in the Chūkyō area.

Due to historical reasons, the line shares its track between Hirai Junction and Toyohashi Station with the JR Iida Line. The agreement between two companies prohibits Meitetsu to have more than 6 trains in one direction per hour on the 3.8 km of shared tracks. Consequently, local trains are unable to reach Toyohashi, instead, terminate at Ina Station.

Basic data
Distance: 99.8 km (approx. 62.0 mi.)
Stations: 60
Gauge: 
Track:
Quadruple: Jingū-mae to Kanayama
Double: Hirai Signal Box to Jingū-mae, Kanayama to Meitetsu Gifu
Single: Toyohashi to Hirai Signal Box (A shared track with JR Iida Line, virtually double-tracked)
Electric supply: 1,500 V DC
Block system: Automatic
Maximum speed at service: 120 km/h (85 km/h between Toyohashi and Hirai Signal Box.)

Service patterns
L: 
SE: 
EX: 
RE: 
LE: 
RL: 
MU:

Stations
For abbreviations of rapid trains, refer to the above section. For distances and connections, see the route diagram. Trains stop at stations marked "●" and pass stations marked "|".

Some trains stop at stations indicated by "▲". At , Limited Expresses only from Tsushima Line stop (which is marked "τ"). For distances and transfers, see the route diagram.

1: Some trains of the marked line directly go through Nagoya Line bound for Meitetsu Nagoya.
2: All trains of Inuyama line directly go through Nagoya Line bound for Meitetsu Nagoya.
2: Some trains of Takehana Line directly go through Nagoya Line bound for Meitetsu Gifu.

History

Four different companies built sections of the line, which were subsequently amalgamated and linked to create today's line.

The Nagoya Electric Railway opened the Ōshikirichō to Marunouchi section (Ichinomiya, Tsushima, Kiyosu Line), dual track and electrified at 600 V DC, in 1914. Transferred to Nagoya Railway (old) in 1921.
The Bisai Railway opened the Kōnomiya to Ichinomiya section (Nakamura Line), single track and electrified at 600 V DC, in 1924. Merged with Nagoya Railroad in 1925 (changes name to Kōnomiya Branch Line). 
The Mino Electric Railway opened the Kasamatsu to Gifu section (Kasamatsu Line), single track and electrified at 600 V DC, in 1914. Merged with Nagoya Railroad in 1930, and the company changed its name to Meigi Railway.

The Marunouchi to Kōnomiya section was opened by the Nagoya Railway in 1928, the Ichinomiya to Kasamatsu section was opened by the Meigi Railway in 1935, and by 1935 the line was dual track as far as Kanō. Meanwhile, the Aichi Electric Railway opened the Jingu-mae to Arimatsu section in 1917 (Arimatsu Line), electrified at 600 V DC, and extended the line to Toyohashi in 1927 (becoming the Toyohashi Line). The Narumi to Yahagibashi section was double-tracked in 1924, and by 1935, the line was double-tracked from Horita to the Hirai Signal Box. The voltage on the line was increased to 1,500 V DC in 1925.

In 1935 the Aichi Electric Railway merged with Meigi Railway, and the company changed its name to Nagoya Railroad. The Jingū-mae to Horita section was double-tracked in 1942, and in 1944, the Nagoya to Jingū-mae section opened as dual track, linking the two sections, although through-running was not possible until the voltage on the Nagoya to Gifu section had been increased to 1,500 V DC in 1948. The line was renamed the Nagoya Main Line.

Former connecting lines
 Marunouchi Station: The Nagoya Electric Railway opened a 1 km line to Kiyosu-Chō, electrified at 600 V DC, in 1914. The company merged with Meitetsu in 1930. Services were deemed non-essential and ceased in 1944, and the line was formally closed in 1948 when the voltage on the main line was increased to 1,500 V DC.
 Ichinomiya Station: The Nagoya Electric Railway opened a 7 km line electrified at 600 V DC from Iwakura on its Inuyama Line in 1913. The voltage on the line was increased to 1,500 V DC in 1948, and the line closed in 1965.
 Gifu Station: Two lines connected here via the Gifu tram system (which itself closed in 2005):
The Mino Electric Railway opened an 18 km 1,067 mm gauge line electrified at 600 V DC to Hon Ibi in 1928. The company merged with Meitetsu in 1930, the line closed in 2001. An 11 km 1,067 mm gauge branch from Kurono (5 km from Hon Ibi) was opened by the Tanigumi Railway to its namesake town in 1926, electrified at 600 V DC. The company merged with Meitetsu in 1944, and the line closed in 2001.

The Nagara Light Railway opened a 5 km 1,067 mm gauge line to Takatomi in 1915, and was acquired by the Mino Electric Railway in 1920, which electrified the line at 600 V DC, merging with Meitetsu in 1930. The line closed in 1960.

See also
List of railway lines in Japan

References
This article incorporates material from the corresponding article in the Japanese Wikipedia.

External links
 Meitetsu official website 
 Meitetsu official website 

Nagoya Main Line
Rail transport in Aichi Prefecture
Rail transport in Gifu Prefecture
Railway lines opened in 1944
1067 mm gauge railways in Japan